Verbalni delikt is the 2011 album by Croatian rapper General Woo. Verbalni delikt was named one of the best in 2011. The album was put on digital download 11. October 2011. on MTV's web site.

The album features artists such as: Ivana Husar, Brka, Kandžija... The album's singles are "Znam" and "Ništa se ne mijenja".

Track listing
Zašto sada šutite
Poruka (skit)
Nikad neće biti bolje
Ne mora bit tako
Kad se prošetam Balkanom (feat. Brka & Frenkie)
Ništa se ne mijenja (feat. Ivana Husar)
Banksteri
Uvod u repchugu (skit)
Repchuga
Vjeruj mi
Mene boli kurac
Eugenika (feat. Magellano)
Kraj priče (skit)
Probudi se
Trojstvo ljudskog straha (feat. Kandžija & Sett)
Ne prepuštam se
J.P.K.P.
U trenutku istine
Užarena masa (skit)
Znam
Zaustavimo nasilje
Mene boli kurac (Remix) (feat. Zelenko)
Ne Spominjem Rat (Hidden Track)

Sources
Možda je sada pravo vrijeme da se bude ljut 

2011 albums
General Woo albums